The operational amplifier integrator is an electronic integration circuit. Based on the operational amplifier (op-amp), it performs the mathematical operation of integration with respect to time; that is, its output voltage is proportional to the input voltage integrated over time.

Applications
The integrator circuit is mostly used in analog computers, analog-to-digital converters and wave-shaping circuits.
A common wave-shaping use is as a charge amplifier and they are usually constructed using an operational amplifier though they can use high gain discrete transistor configurations.

Design 
The input current is offset by a negative feedback current flowing in the capacitor, which is generated by an increase in output voltage of the amplifier. The output voltage is therefore dependent on the value of input current it has to offset and the inverse of the value of the feedback capacitor. The greater the capacitor value, the less output voltage has to be generated to produce a particular feedback current flow.

The input impedance of the circuit is almost zero because of the Miller effect. Hence all the stray capacitances (the cable capacitance, the amplifier input capacitance, etc.) are virtually grounded and they have no influence on the output signal.

Ideal circuit
This circuit operates by passing a current that charges or discharges the capacitor  during the time under consideration, which strives to retain the virtual ground condition at the input by off-setting the effect of the input current:

Referring to the above diagram, if the op-amp is assumed to be ideal, then the voltage at the inverting (-) input is held equal to the voltage at the non-inverting (+) input as a virtual ground. The input voltage passes a current  through the resistor producing a compensating current flow through the series capacitor to maintain the virtual ground. This charges or discharges the capacitor over time. Because the resistor and capacitor are connected to a virtual ground, the input current does not vary with capacitor charge, so a linear integration that works across all frequencies is achieved (unlike ).

The circuit can be analyzed by applying Kirchhoff's current law at the inverting input:

For an ideal op-amp,  amps, so:

Furthermore, the capacitor has a voltage-current relationship governed by the equation:

Substituting the appropriate variables:

For an ideal op-amp,  volts, so:

Integrating both sides with respect to time:

Practical circuit
This practical integrator attempts to address a number of flaws of the ideal integrator circuit:

Real op-amps have a finite open-loop gain, an input offset voltage  and input bias currents , which may not be well-matched and may be distinguished as  going into the inverting input and  going into the non-inverting input. This can cause several issues for the ideal design; most importantly, if , both the output offset voltage and the input bias current  can cause current to pass through the capacitor, causing the output voltage to drift over time until the op-amp saturates. Similarly, if  were a signal centered about zero volts (i.e. without a DC component), no drift would be expected in an ideal circuit, but may occur in a real circuit.

To negate the effect of the input bias current, it is necessary for the non-inverting terminal to include a resistor  which simplifies to  provided that  is much smaller than the load resistance  and the feedback resistance .

Also, in a DC steady state, the capacitor acts as an open circuit. The DC gain of the ideal circuit is therefore infinite (or in practice, the open-loop gain of a non-ideal op-amp). To counter this, a large resistor  is inserted in parallel with the feedback capacitor. This limits the DC gain of the circuit to a finite value.

The addition of these resistors turns the output drift into a finite, preferably small, DC error voltage:

Frequency response

The frequency responses of the practical and ideal integrator are shown in the above figure. For both circuits, the crossover frequency , at which the gain is 0 dB, is given by:

The 3 dB cutoff frequency  of the practical circuit is given by:

The practical integrator circuit is equivalent to an active first-order low-pass filter. The gain is relatively constant up to the cutoff frequency and decreases by 20 dB per decade beyond it. The integration operation occurs for frequencies in the range , provided that  (i.e.).

References

Analog circuits
Linear electronic circuits